The theorem on the surjection of Fréchet spaces is an important theorem, due to Stefan Banach, that characterizes when a continuous linear operator between Fréchet spaces is surjective.

The importance of this theorem is related to the open mapping theorem, which states that a continuous linear surjection between Fréchet spaces is an open map. Often in practice, one knows that they have a continuous linear map between Fréchet spaces and wishes to show that it is surjective in order to use the open mapping theorem to deduce that it is also an open mapping. This theorem may help reach that goal.

Preliminaries, definitions, and notation 
Let  be a continuous linear map between topological vector spaces. 

The set  endowed with this topology is denoted by  The topology  is the weakest topology on  making all linear functionals in  continuous. 

Surjection of Fréchet spaces

Extensions of the theorem

Lemmas 
The following lemmas are used to prove the theorems on the surjectivity of Fréchet spaces. They are useful even on their own.

Applications

Borel's theorem on power series expansions

Linear partial differential operators 

if  is of order  and if  then

See also

References

Bibliography 

  
  
  

Theorems in functional analysis